William Burgoyne may refer to:
 William Burgoyne (Chancellor of the Duchy of Lancaster), Chancellor of the Duchy of Lancaster 1400–1404
 William Burgoyne (academic) (died 1523), priest and academic at Cambridge
 William Burgoyne (cricketer) (born 1942), cricketer for Berkshire